NMB Bank Nepal is a commercial bank in Nepal with headquarters in Kathmandu. The bank is licensed by central bank of Nepal, the Nepal Rastra Bank, and has 202 branches across the nation providing retail and commercial banking services.

The bank's shares are publicly traded on the Nepal Stock Exchange. The Bank has a joint venture agreement with Netherlands Development Finance Company (FMO) a Dutch development bank which holds 13.69% of the bank's shares and is the largest shareholder of the Bank.

History
It was founded in May 2008 and is licensed as an "A" class financial institution.  It was created as a merger with four financial institutions, Bhrikuti Development Bank, Pathibhara Bikas Bank, Prudential Finance Company, Clean Energy Development.

In September 2016, the bank signed a joint venture agreement with the Netherlands Development Finance Company (Nederlandse Financierings-Maatschappij voor Ontwikkelingslanden, following which FMO became the single largest shareholder of the bank.

NMB Bank has been recognized as 'Bank of the Year in Nepal' for two consecutive years, 2017 and 2018 by The Banker, a service of the Financial Times, for its leading role in the country’s financial sector by using new digital technologies.
In September 2019 NMB Bank has acquired Om Development Bank.

See also
 List of banks in Nepal

References

Banks of Nepal
2008 establishments in Nepal